Peng Zhenming, better known by his in-game name Aluka, is a retired Chinese professional gamer. From 2012 to 2016, he was a professional League of Legends player; in 2017 he announced a career as a professional PlayerUnknown's Battlegrounds player. For most of his League of Legends career, Aluka played as the top laner for Team WE of the League of Legends Pro League (LPL), and was renowned in China as one of the most skilled players in his position.

Career

League of Legends 
Aluka began his career in 2012 competing in the HAN Pro League as a member of Positive Energy, where he finished second.

In 2013 Aluka established himself as a strong member of Positive Energy, never placing outside the top four in any tournament. After losing in the semifinals in G-League 2012 Season 2 and a fourth-place finish in GIGABYTE StarsWar League Season 2 he earned two second-place finishes in the 2013 LPL Spring Playoffs and WVW National Elite Cup, where he was defeated by OMG in the finals on both occasions. He then finished fourth at StarsWar 8 before he and Positive Energy won the 2013 LPL Summer Playoffs defeating OMG 3–2 in the finals.

Aluka moved to Team WE in 2014 and continued his string of high placements, but seemed to have trouble besting EDward Gaming (EDG). After he was defeated 2–0 in the finals of the NVIDIA Game Festival 2014 by EDG, he and Team WE were eliminated by them again in similar fashion, this time in the semifinals of the National Electronic Sports Tournament 2014. The two met again in Demacia Cup Season 2 where he and Team WE made the score much closer, but were ultimately taken down 3–2 in the finals.

Due to their first-place finish at IEM Shenzhen, Team WE were invited to compete at the IEM Season IX - World Championship. After a Round 1 loss against Team SoloMid, the team went on to beat Gambit Gaming in Round 1 of the losers bracket. Round 2 of the losers bracket saw WE beat CJ Entus, securing the team a place in the bracket stage. Aluka and Team WE then pulled off the upset of the tournament, emerging victorious in their semifinal matchup over the previously unbeaten GE Tigers. They went on to finish runner-up after losing to Team SoloMid in the final of the tournament.

PlayerUnknown's Battlegrounds

References 

Living people
Chinese esports players
Team WE players
League of Legends top lane players
Year of birth missing (living people)